Ryan James Law (born 8 September 1999) is an English professional footballer who plays as a left back for Yeovil Town on loan from Plymouth Argyle.

Career

Plymouth Argyle
Whilst he was an academy player, Law featured on the bench for Argyle in a 5–2 EFL League One defeat to Gillingham on 5 May 2018, but did not come on.

Law made his professional debut on 13 November 2018 in an EFL Trophy match between Argyle and EFL League Two side Newport County, where he started at left-back. Newport won the game 2–0. He moved on loan to Gloucester City in early 2019.

Loan Spells
On 19 July 2019 Law joined Truro City of the Southern League Premier South on a 28-day loan. The loan deal was then extended until 18 January 2020. On 19 January 2020 it was confirmed, that the deal had been extended once again, this time for the rest of the season. Due to the COVID-19 pandemic, the league season was cut short and declared null and void with Truro sitting top of the league at the time.

On 15 March 2021, Law joined National League side Torquay United on a one-month loan deal. He returned to Plymouth on 15 April 2021 helping the club to six victories in the eight matches he played, his last appearance coming in a vital top of the table 1–0 victory over Sutton United.

Return to Plymouth
Law scored a first senior goal for the club in a 3–0 victory over Sheffield Wednesday, sealing the victory in the seventh minute of added time having only been brought on as a substitute two minutes prior. Law signed a new one-year contract extension with Plymouth on 6 May 2022.

Gillingham loan
On 18 July 2022, Law joined League Two club Gillingham on a season-long loan deal. On 9 January 2023, Plymouth Argyle recalled Law from his loan early.

Yeovil Town loan
On 10 February 2023, Law joined National League side Yeovil Town on loan until the end of the season.

Career statistics

References

1999 births
Living people
People from Kingsteignton
Footballers from Devon
English footballers
Association football defenders
Association football fullbacks
Plymouth Argyle F.C. players
Gloucester City A.F.C. players
Truro City F.C. players
Chippenham Town F.C. players
Torquay United F.C. players
Gillingham F.C. players
Yeovil Town F.C. players
Southern Football League players
National League (English football) players
English Football League players